A QA & UX Manager work with both Quality Assurance (QA) and User Experience (UX) in relation to video game and software development. QA & UX Manager can work independently or in co-operation with other QA & UX Managers, like in larger QA & UX teams with other QA & UX Managers and game testers. In the larger QA & UX teams, there is usually a lead QA & UX Group Manager that works as the daily leader of this team of QA & UX Managers and game testers. QA & UX Manager also usually work very close with the project managers and the QA Programmer as part of video game development.

QA & UX Managers work and tasks 
In terms of work assignments that QA & UX Managers do, this can include  planning and management, technical testing, User Experience, metrics and communication. In terms of planning and management done by the QA & UX Manager, this may include making test plans, test cycles and test cases for a video game as well as being responsible for the overall testing and recruiting of game testers in a video game development.  In terms of technical testing that the QA & UX Managers do, this can be very alternating and can be everything from testing correctness and regression to check an optimization in a video game.  In terms of User Experience that the QA & UX Manager work with, this is particularly centered around making interviews and doing monitoring in relation to User Experience of a video game by the player. In terms of Metrics that the QA & UX Manager work with, this task mainly is about collecting and analyze data an about game and gamer activity in relation to a particular game. In terms of the communication characterized parts of the work the QA & UX Manager do, this is often done in relation with meetings with the development team and where the QA & UX Manager pass on his or her knowledge and data to the development team.

References

Computer occupations
Development
Product development
Video game design
Video game development